Princess Charlotte may refer to:

People 
 Charlotte Christine of Brunswick-Lüneburg (1694–1715), wife of Tsarevich Alexei Petrovich of Russia and mother of Tsar Peter II, Emperor of Russia
 Charlotte Aglaé d'Orléans (1700–1761), wife of Francesco III, Duke of Modena
 Charlotte, Princess Royal (1766–1828), eldest daughter of King George III; Queen consort of King Frederick I of Württemberg
 Princess Louise Charlotte of Denmark (1789–1864), married Prince William of Hesse-Kassel (or Hesse-Cassel), mother of Queen Louise of Denmark
 Princess Charlotte of Wales (1796–1817), only child of King George IV of the United Kingdom; first wife of Leopold I of the Belgians
 Alexandra Feodorovna (Charlotte of Prussia) (1798–1860), born Princess Charlotte of Prussia, empress consort of Nicholas I of Russia as Alexandra Feodorovna
 Princess Charlotte of Württemberg (1807–1873), wife of Grand Duke Michael Pavlovich of Russia under the name Elena Pavlovna
 Princess Charlotte of Clarence (1819), eldest legitimate child of the future King William IV of the United Kingdom, died hours after birth
 Charlotte Honorine Joséphine Pauline Bonaparte (1832–1901), daughter of Charles Lucien Bonaparte
 Charlotte of Belgium (1840–1927), a.k.a. Carlota, empress-consort of Maximilian of Mexico from 1864 till the emperor was deposed and shot in 1867
 Charlotte, Duchess of Saxe-Meiningen (1860–1919), Princess of Prussia
 Princess Charlotte, Duchess of Valentinois (1898–1977)
 Princess Joséphine Charlotte of Belgium (1927–2005), wife of Jean, Grand Duke of Luxembourg
 Charlotte Casiraghi (born 1986), sometimes incorrectly called Princess Charlotte of Monaco
 Princess Charlotte of Wales (born 2015), daughter of William, Prince of Wales and currently third in line to the British throne

Places 
 The Princess Charlotte, now The Charlotte, a music venue in Leicester, England
 Princess Charlotte Bay, in far North Queensland, Australia

Transportation 
 , the name of several ships
 , the name of several ships of the Royal Navy
 , the name of several ships during the Napoleonic Wars
 Princess Charlotte, the name of a GWR 4000 Class locomotive